A flat spot, or wheel flat, also called spalling or shelling, is a fault in railroad wheel shape.  A flat spot occurs when a rail vehicle's wheelset is dragged along the rail after the wheel/axle has stopped rotating. Flat spots are usually caused by use of the emergency brake, or slip and slide conditions that causes wheels to lock up while the train is still moving. Flat spots are more common in the autumn and winter when the rails are slippery. Flat spots can also be caused by faulty brakes or wheelset bearings.

Consequences
If the flat spot is very small, the rail vehicle will be able to continue being used. The fault is removed later in the wheelset turning process, using a wheel lathe. However, because of the heat suffered while being dragged along the rail and the impacts suffered afterward, these wheels are more likely to break due to changes in the alloy structure.

If the flat spot is very large (as in the picture), strands of molten metal may have stuck on one side of the flat spot, making it impossible for the wheel to turn due to insufficient clearance between the rolling surface and the brake block. In this case, the wheelset must be replaced immediately.

In extreme cases such as the 1971 Salem, Illinois derailment a wheel with an untreated flat spot can damage the track and cause a derailment.

Automobile use

Engine response
In automobile parlance, a flat spot occurs when the driver presses the accelerator pedal and there is a delay in the engine's response.  This fault was more common before cars had electronic fuel injection.       Many engines, especially modified ones, still have flat spots in the torque curve due to resonances in the intake system, although manufacturers try to eliminate these by use of a plenum chamber, careful design and testing.

Car tires

A literal flat spot can occur on car tires if the vehicle is parked without moving for some time (generally longer than a week), and the tire deformation at the bottom of the wheel becomes semi-permanent.  The flat spot gradually relieves itself when the car is driven but can temporarily give similar symptoms to an unbalanced wheel.  Cars being laid up for extended periods, or intermittently-used caravans and trailers, should be kept on axle stands (tyres not in contact with the ground) or have the tires over-inflated to eliminate or reduce this problem.  "Tire savers", curved wheel stands, are also available for use during storage.  These reduce or avoid the problem by cradling the lower part of the tire tread and preventing the usual deformation where it rests on the ground.

Another cause seen frequently in racing is locking the wheels during heavy braking.

References

Train wheels